Maa Samleswari is the presiding deity of Sambalpur.

History
On the bank of river Mahanadi, goddess Samaleswari is worshipped from ancient times as Jagatjanani, Adishakti, Mahalaxmi and Mahasaraswati. The region in which the temple is situated has a rich cultural heritage. Sambalpur is popularly known as "Hirakhanda" from ancient times. Greek explorer Ptolemy described the place as Sambalak. According to French traveller Jean-Baptiste Tavernier and English historian Edward Gibbon, diamonds were exported to Rome from Sambalpur.

References

See also
 Samalpur

Hindu goddesses
Hindu temples in Sambalpur district
Shakti temples